Acanthoderes quattuordecimguttata is a species of beetle in the family Cerambycidae. It was described by Schoenherr in 1817.

References

Acanthoderes
Beetles described in 1817